A prosimetrum (plural prosimetra) is a poetic composition which exploits a combination of prose (prosa) and verse (metrum); in particular, it is a text composed in alternating segments of prose and verse. It is widely found in Western and Eastern literature. While narrative prosimetrum may encompass at one extreme a prose story with occasional verse interspersed, and at the other, verse with occasional prose explanations, in true prosimetrum the two forms are represented in more equal measure. A distinction is sometimes drawn between texts in which verse is the dominant form and those in which prose dominates; there the terms prosimetrum and versiprose are applied respectively.

Usage of term
The term prosimetrum is first attested in the Rationes dictandi of Hugh of Bologna, in the early 12th century. Sources differ on the date, one suggesting around 1119, another about 1130. Hugh divided metrical composition into three kinds: quantitative verse (carmina), verse based on syllable count and assonance (rithmi), and "the mixed form ... when a part is expressed in verse and a part in prose" (prosimetrum). The derived adjective prosimetrical occurs in English as early as Thomas Blount’s Glossographia (1656) where it is defined as "consisting partly of Prose, partly of Meteer or Verse".

Works such as historical chronicles and annals, which quote poetry previously composed by other authors, are not generally regarded as "true" prosimetra. In the Old Norse-Icelandic tradition, however, vernacular histories and family sagas that quote verses by other authors are commonly accepted as prosimetra. Quoted or "inset" verses are a familiar feature of longer historical texts in the Old Irish and Middle Irish traditions as well. The role of such verse quotations within the prose narrative varies; they may be mined as historical source-material, cited as factual corroboration of an event or recited by a character as dialogue.

Examples
Satyricon (c. 1st century CE) by Petronius
The Mahabharata (c. 4th century?)
Maqamat Badi' az-Zaman al-Hamadhani (4th century)
Consolation of Philosophy (c. 524) by Boethius
One Thousand and One Nights (c. 8th century?)
 De rectoribus christianis, by Sedulius Scottus (9th century)
The Ring of the Dove (c. 1022) by Ibn Hazm
Cosmographia (c. 1147) by Bernard Silvestris
Acallam na Senórach (c. 12th century)
Buile Shuibhne (c. 12th century)
Pantheon (1188) by Godfrey of Viterbo
Gesta Danorum (c. 1208) by Saxo Grammaticus
Aucassin et Nicolette (c. 13th century)
The Secret History of the Mongols (c. 13th century)
La Vita Nuova (c. 1295) by Dante Alighieri
Eyrbyggja saga (c. 13th century)
Grettis saga (c. 14th century)
Arcadia (1504) by Sannazaro
Diana (1559), by Jorge de Montemayor
The Countess of Pembroke's Arcadia (1590), by Philip Sidney
The Lover's Watch (1686), by Aphra Behn (translation of La Montre d'amour [1666] by Balthazar de Bonnecorse)
Oku no Hosomichi (1694) by Matsuo Bashō
 Spring and All (1923) by William Carlos Williams 
 In Parenthesis (1937) by David Jones
Pale Fire (1962) by Vladimir Nabokov

See also
 Menippus
 Haibun
 Maqāma

References

Bibliography
Dronke, Peter. Verse with Prose from Petronius to Dante. Cambridge, MA: Harvard University Press, 1994. 
Green, Roland, et al., ed. The Princeton Encyclopedia of Poetry and Poetics. Princeton: Princeton University Press, 2012. 
Harris, Joseph, and Karl Reichl, ed. Prosimetrum: Cross-Cultural Perspectives on Narrative in Prose and Verse. Cambridge, Eng.: D. S. Brewer, 1997. 
Jones, Samuel, Aled Jones, and Jennifer Dukes Knight, ed. Proceedings of the Harvard Celtic Colloquium, 24/25, 2004 and 2005. Cambridge, MA: Harvard University Press, 2009. 
O’Donoghue, Heather. Skaldic Verse and the Poetics of Saga Narrative. Oxford: Oxford University Press, 2005. 
Ross, Margaret Clunies. A History of Old Norse Poetry and Poetics. Cambridge: D.S. Brewer, 2005. 

Literary genres